Nais is a 1945 French film directed by Raymond Leboursier and starring Fernandel. The script was written by Marcel Pagnol based on the story "Naïs Micoulin" by Émile Zola.

It was one of the most popular movies in France in 1945 with 3,467,792 admissions.

References

External links
Nais at IMDb

1945 drama films
1945 films
Films based on works by Émile Zola
French drama films
1940s French-language films
French black-and-white films
1940s French films